L3 Deep Dwarven Delve is a fantasy adventure module or "module" for  Advanced Dungeons & Dragons (1st edition).

Plot summary
Deep Dwarven Delve is a straightforward dungeon crawl that leads the players through an abandoned dwarven mine, centering on freeing dwarves in another world from thralldom.

Publication history

Deep Dwarven Delve is a sequel to L1 The Secret of Bone Hill and L2 The Assassin's Knot, and was written as the intended final adventure in the "L" series. Len Lakofka completed the manuscript in 1979 for the 1st Edition AD&D rules, although it was not published and lay forgotten in the TSR design vault for twenty years. The manuscript was eventually recovered, and as part of the Dungeons & Dragons game's Silver Anniversary celebration, L3 was finally published as one of the modules available as a limited release as part of the Dungeons & Dragons Silver Anniversary Collector's Edition set released in 1999. However, in discussions at www.dragonsfoot.org, Lakofka has stated that the rewrite he had done with one of Wizards of the Coast's editors had gotten lost, and the published version was "about 80% of what the first draft of the module was."

Lakofka published a sequel in 2009, Devilspawn, which was released through Dragonsfoot.

Reception

References

Dwarves in popular culture
Greyhawk modules
Role-playing game supplements introduced in 1999